The Crisis is an American television series that aired live on NBC from October 5, 1949, to December 28, 1949.

Synopsis
The series featured a guest describing events leading up to a critical moment in their life. At the major turning point in the story, the guest's story was stopped, and professional actors who did not know the outcome of the event, would act out the rest of the guest's story as they imagined it might have been resolved. The actors worked unrehearsed and without scripts. After the scene was acted out, the guest would return to explain what actually happened.

Cast 

 Bob Cunningham
 Arthur Peterson Jr.
 Adrian Spies

1949 American television series debuts
1949 American television series endings
Black-and-white American television shows
American live television series
NBC original programming